Marvin E. Proffer (February 4, 1931 – March 27, 2019) was an American politician who served in the Missouri House of Representatives. He was born in Cape Girardeau, Missouri and attended Southwest Missouri State University and the University of Missouri in Columbia, studying education. He served in the Missouri House of Representatives for the 156th district 1962 to 1986. He was a member of the Democratic party. He died in 2019 at the age of 88.

References

1931 births
2019 deaths
Democratic Party members of the Missouri House of Representatives
People from Cape Girardeau, Missouri
University of Missouri alumni